Inferior thyroid may refer to:
 Inferior thyroid veins
 Inferior thyroid artery